Mealing is a surname. Notable people with the surname include:

Amanda Mealing (born 1967), British actress
Bonnie Mealing (1912–2002), Australian freestyle and backstroke swimmer
John Mealing (born 1942), British keyboards player, composer and arranger
Maurice Mealing (1893-1918), British World War I flying ace